is a feminine Japanese given name.

Possible writings
Junko can be written using different kanji characters and can mean any of the following:
純子, "pure, child"
順子, "order, child"
淳子, "pure, child"
潤子, "rich/favor/wet, child"
準子, "conform, child"
洵子, "truth, child"
The name can also be written in hiragana or katakana.

People
Junko (manga artist) (ぢゅん子), Japanese manga artist
, Japanese actress
, Japanese singer
Junko Chodos (born 1939), Japanese-American contemporary artist
, Japanese torture and murder victim
, Japanese former competitive figure skater
, Japanese Paralympic judoka
, Japanese actress and voice actress represented by Production Baobab
Junko Itō, American linguist
, Japanese voice actress
, Japanese singer
, Japanese television announcer
, Japanese actress
Junko Minagawa (純子, born 1975), Japanese voice actress
, Japanese actress
, Japanese manga artist
, Japanese metalwork sculptor
, Japanese composer
, Japanese former volleyball player
, Japanese high jumper
, Japanese voice actress
, Japanese serial killer
Junko Okada (純子), Japanese voice actress
, Japanese singer
, Japanese swimmer
, Japanese voice actress
, first woman to climb Mt. Everest
, Japanese voice actress
, Japanese synchronized swimmer
, Japanese singer-songwriter
Junko Yoshioka, New York City-based fashion designer

Fictional characters
Ibara Junko, a fictional character in Megatokyo
Junko Enoshima (江ノ島 盾子), a fictional character and the main antagonist of the "Hope's Peak Academy" arc in Danganronpa 
Junko Hattori (服部 絢子), a fictional character in the light novel series Ichiban Ushiro no Daimaou
Junko Kaname (鹿目 詢子), a character from the anime series Puella Magi Madoka Magica
Junko Konno, a character from the MAPPA idol anime series Zombie Land Saga
Junko Mochida (持田 潤子), a minor character in the hentai anime series Bible Black
Junko Saotome (早乙女淳子), a fictional character from Nana
Junko Takei (竹井醇子), a fictional character from Strike Witches
Junko Wallop, a fictional character in the animated television series Storm Hawks
Junko (純狐), boss character from Legacy of Lunatic Kingdom, a Touhou Project game

Japanese feminine given names